Mall of Georgia is an enclosed super-regional shopping mall located in unincorporated Gwinnett County, Georgia, near the city of Buford,  northeast of Atlanta. Opened in 1999, it is currently the largest shopping mall in both the Atlanta Metropolitan Area and the state of Georgia, consisting of more than two hundred stores on three levels. Featured in the mall is a large village section, comprising lifestyle tenants and restaurants in an outdoor setting, as well as a 500-seat amphitheater. In 2017 the Mall of Georgia renovated the indoor food court area by updating the seating arrangements, furniture styles, and color schemes. Mall of Georgia was built by and is still owned by Simon Property Group. A portion of the Ivy Creek Greenway runs along the shopping mall area. The anchor stores are Von Maur, Macy's, Dillard's, Belk, JCPenney, Havertys Furniture, Barnes & Noble, Dick's Sporting Goods, and Regal Cinemas.

History
The Mall of Georgia officially opened August 13, 1999 drawing shoppers away from Gwinnett Place Mall, and featured Dillard's, JCPenney, Lord & Taylor, and Nordstrom as its anchor stores, with Bed Bath & Beyond, Haverty's, and Galyan's (now Dick's Sporting Goods) as additional mini anchors. Lord & Taylor, Dillard's, and JCPenny opened on August 11, 1999, two days before the official opening of the mall.  The Mall of Georgia also has a 20-screen Regal Cinemas and an IMAX Theater.  In 2000, Atlanta-based Rich's was added on, and many more mall stores were added, bringing the total number of stores in the mall to more than 200. Lord & Taylor was repositioned and shuttered entirely; it was replaced with Belk in 2005. Following Federated Department Stores' (now Macy's, Inc.) decision to consolidate nameplates in 2003, the Rich's store at Mall of Georgia was dual-branded as Rich's-Macy's, and the Rich's name was dropped entirely in 2005.
In 2015, it was announced Von Maur would be joining the center replacing Nordstrom which would also close.

Current anchors
Belk (2005-present)
Dillard's (August 11, 1999-present)
JCPenney (August 11, 1999-present)
Macy's (March 6, 2005-present)
Von Maur (2016-present)

Former anchors
Lord & Taylor (August 11, 1999-2003)
Nordstrom (August 13, 1999-2015)
Rich's (2000-March 6, 2005)

Statue
The statue atop the mall is of Button Gwinnett, one of the first men to sign the United States Declaration of Independence and for whom its location of Gwinnett County is named.

References

External links
 Mall of Georgia

Shopping malls in the Atlanta metropolitan area
Buildings and structures in Gwinnett County, Georgia
Simon Property Group
Shopping malls established in 1999
Tourist attractions in Gwinnett County, Georgia
1999 establishments in Georgia (U.S. state)